Vlad Nistor is a Romanian politician currently serving as a Member of the European Parliament for the National Liberal Party (PNL).

References

Living people
MEPs for Romania 2019–2024
National Liberal Party (Romania) MEPs
National Liberal Party (Romania) politicians
Year of birth missing (living people)